Daniel Santos Silva or simply Daniel Lovinho (born January 9, 1989) is a Brazilian footballer who plays as a forward.

Career
Daniel Lovinho arrived at Palmeiras in 2004, aged 15. He played in the Copa São Paulo de Futebol Júnior, where he excelled and moved up to first team, scoring 14 goals in 2008.

He made his debut for his team against the Santo André in the Campeonato Paulista on January 21, 2009, when he replaced Diego Souza. His first game as a starter was against Coritiba, also in 2009.

In 2010, he was loaned to Goiás for one year.

The team of Goiás returned him to Palmeiras for an unknown reasons, then he went out on loan again to Ponte Preta for one year. On September 28, 2010, Lovinho made his first career goal, closing the scoring in a tie with Coritiba.

He played for Japanese side Kyoto Sanga in the 2015 and 2016 seasons.

Club statistics
Updated to 14 February 2017.

References

External links
 

1989 births
Living people
Brazilian footballers
Brazilian expatriate footballers
Association football forwards
Campeonato Brasileiro Série A players
Sociedade Esportiva Palmeiras players
Associação Atlética Ponte Preta players
América Futebol Clube (MG) players
Ipatinga Futebol Clube players
Clube Atlético Linense players
Expatriate footballers in Japan
Expatriate footballers in South Korea
Brazilian expatriate sportspeople in Japan
Brazilian expatriate sportspeople in South Korea
J2 League players
K League 2 players
Thespakusatsu Gunma players
Kyoto Sanga FC players
Seoul E-Land FC players
Footballers from São Paulo